Artificial insemination is the deliberate introduction of sperm into a female's cervix or uterine cavity for the purpose of achieving a pregnancy through in vivo fertilization by means other than sexual intercourse. It is a fertility treatment for humans, and is a common practice in animal breeding, including dairy cattle (see Frozen bovine semen) and pigs.

Artificial insemination may employ assisted reproductive technology, sperm donation and animal husbandry techniques. Artificial insemination techniques available include intracervical insemination (ICI) and intrauterine insemination (IUI).

Humans

History
The first recorded case of artificial insemination was John Hunter in 1790, who helped impregnate a linen draper's wife. The first reported case of artificial insemination by donor occurred in 1884: William H. Pancoast, a professor in Philadelphia, took sperm from his "best looking" student to inseminate an anesthetized woman without her knowledge. The case was reported 25 years later in a medical journal.  The sperm bank was developed in Iowa starting in the 1950s in research conducted by University of Iowa medical school researchers Jerome Sherman and Raymond Bunge.

In the United Kingdom, the British obstetrician Mary Barton founded one of the first fertility clinics to offer donor insemination in the 1930s, with her husband Bertold Wiesner fathering hundreds of offspring.

In the 1980s, direct intraperitoneal insemination (DIPI) was occasionally used, where doctors injected sperm into the lower abdomen through a surgical hole or incision, with the intention of letting them find the oocyte at the ovary or after entering the genital tract through the ostium of the fallopian tube.

General

The sperm used in artificial insemination may be provided by either the woman's husband or partner (partner sperm) or by a known or anonymous sperm donor (see sperm donation (donor sperm)). The beneficiaries of artificial insemination are women who desire to give birth to their own child who may be single, women who are in a lesbian relationship or women who are in a heterosexual relationship but with a male partner who is infertile or who has a physical impairment which prevents full intercourse from taking place. Artificial insemination techniques were originally used mainly to assist heterosexual couples to conceive where they were having difficulties. With the advancement of techniques in this field, notably ICSI, the use of artificial insemination for such couples has largely been rendered unnecessary. However, there are still reasons why a couple would seek to use artificial insemination using the male partner's sperm. In the case of such couples, before artificial insemination is turned to as the solution, doctors will require an examination of both the male and female involved in order to remove any and all physical hindrances that are preventing them from naturally achieving a pregnancy including any factors which prevent the couple from having satisfactory sexual intercourse. The couple is also given a fertility test to determine the motility, number, and viability of the male's sperm and the success of the female's ovulation. From these tests, the doctor may or may not recommend a form of artificial insemination. The results of investigations may, for example, show that the woman's immune system may be rejecting her partner's sperm as invading molecules. Women who have issues with the cervix – such as cervical scarring, cervical blockage from endometriosis, or thick cervical mucus – may also benefit from artificial insemination, since the sperm must pass through the cervix to result in fertilization.

Nowadays artificial insemination in humans is mainly used as a substitute for sexual intercourse for women without a male partner who wish to have their own children and who do so where sperm from a sperm donor is used. Donor sperm may be used in other ways, such as IVF and ICSI and a woman having a baby by a sperm donor will usually also have these methods available to her as alternatives to artificial insemination.
Intracervical insemination is the easiest and most common insemination technique and can be used in the home for self-insemination without medical practitioner assistance. Compared with natural insemination (i.e., insemination by sexual intercourse), artificial insemination can be more expensive and more invasive, and may require professional assistance.

Some countries have laws which restrict and regulate who can donate sperm and who is able to receive artificial insemination, and the consequences of such insemination. Some women who live in a jurisdiction which does not permit artificial insemination in the circumstance in which she finds herself may travel to another jurisdiction which permits it.

If the procedure is successful, the woman will conceive and carry a baby to term in the normal manner. A pregnancy resulting from artificial insemination is no different from a pregnancy achieved by sexual intercourse. In all cases of artificial insemination, the recipient woman will be the biological mother of any child produced, and the male whose sperm is used will be the biological father.

There are multiple methods used to obtain the semen necessary for artificial insemination. Some methods require only men, while others require a combination of a male and female. Those that require only men to obtain semen are masturbation or the aspiration of sperm by means of a puncture of the testicle and epydidymus. Methods of collecting semen that involve a combination of a male and female include interrupted intercourse, intercourse with a 'collection condom', or the post-coital aspiration of the semen from the vagina.

Preparations
Timing is critical, as the window and opportunity for fertilization is little more than twelve hours from the release of the ovum. To increase the chance of success, the woman's menstrual cycle is closely observed, often using ovulation kits, ultrasounds or blood tests, such as basal body temperature tests over, noting the color and texture of the vaginal mucus, and the softness of the nose of her cervix. To improve the success rate of artificial insemination, drugs to create a stimulated cycle may be used, but the use of such drugs also results in an increased chance of a multiple birth.

Sperm can be provided fresh or washed. Washed sperm is required in certain situations. Pre- and post-concentration of motile sperm is counted. Sperm from a sperm bank will be frozen and quarantined for a period, and the donor will be tested before and after production of the sample to ensure that he does not carry a transmissible disease. Sperm from a sperm bank will also be suspended in a semen extender which assists with freezing, storing and shipping.

If sperm is provided by a private donor, either directly or through a sperm agency, it is usually supplied fresh, not frozen, and it will not be quarantined. Donor sperm provided in this way may be given directly to the recipient woman or her partner, or it may be transported in specially insulated containers. Some donors have their own freezing apparatus to freeze and store their sperm.

Techniques

Semen used is either fresh, raw, or frozen. Where donor sperm is supplied by a sperm bank, it will always be quarantined and frozen, and will need to be thawed before use. The sperm is ideally donated after two or three days of abstinence, without lubrication as the lubricant can inhibit the sperm motility. When an ovum is released, semen is introduced into the woman's vagina, uterus or cervix, depending on the method being used.

Sperm is occasionally inserted twice within a 'treatment cycle'.

Intracervical
Intracervical insemination (ICI) is the method of artificial insemination which most closely simulates the natural ejaculation of semen by the penis into the vagina during intercourse. It is painless and is the simplest, easiest and most common method of artificial insemination involving the introduction of unwashed or raw semen into the vagina at the entrance to the cervix, usually by means of a needleless syringe.

ICI is commonly used in the home, by self-insemination and practitioner insemination. Sperm used in ICI inseminations does not have to be 'washed' to remove seminal fluid so that raw semen from a private donor may be used. Semen supplied by a sperm bank prepared for ICI or IUI use is suitable for ICI. ICI is a popular method of insemination amongst single and lesbian women purchasing donor sperm on-line.

Although ICI is the simplest method of artificial insemination, a meta-analysis has shown no difference in live birth rates compared with IUI. It may also be performed privately by the woman, or, if she has a partner, in the presence of her partner, or by her partner. ICI was previously used in many fertility centers as a method of insemination, although its popularity in this context has waned as other, more reliable methods of insemination have become available.

During ICI, air is expelled from a needleless syringe which is then filled with semen which has been allowed to liquify. A specially-designed syringe, wider and with a more rounded end, may be used for this purpose. Any further enclosed air is removed by gently pressing the plunger forward. The woman lies on her back and the syringe is inserted into the vagina. Care is optimal when inserting the syringe, so that the tip is as close to the entrance to the cervix as possible. A vaginal speculum may be used for this purpose and a catheter may be attached to the tip of the syringe to ensure delivery of the semen as close to the entrance to the cervix as possible. The plunger is then slowly pushed forward and the semen in the syringe is gently emptied deep into the vagina. It is important that the syringe is emptied slowly for safety and for the best results, bearing in mind that the purpose of the procedure is the replicate as closely as possible a natural deposit of the semen in the vagina. The syringe (and catheter if used) may be left in place for several minutes before removal. The woman can bring herself to orgasm so that the cervix 'dips down' into the pool of semen, again replicating closely vaginal intercourse, and this may improve the success rate.

Following insemination, fertile sperm will swim through the cervix into the uterus and from there to the fallopian tubes in a natural way as if the sperm had been deposited in the vagina through intercourse. The woman is therefore advised to lie still for about half-an-hour to assist conception.

One insemination during a cycle is usually sufficient. Additional inseminations during the same cycle may not improve the chances of a pregnancy.

Ordinary sexual lubricants should not be used in the process, but special fertility or 'sperm-friendly' lubricants can be used for increased ease and comfort.

When performed at home without the presence of a professional, aiming the sperm in the vagina at the neck of the cervix may be more difficult to achieve and the effect may be to 'flood' the vagina with semen, rather than to target it specifically at the entrance to the cervix. This procedure is sometimes referred to as 'intravaginal insemination' (IVI). Sperm supplied by a sperm bank will be frozen and must be allowed to thaw before insemination. The sealed end of the straw itself must be cut off and the open end of the straw is usually fixed straight on to the tip of the syringe, allowing the contents to be drawn into the syringe. Sperm from more than one straw can generally be used in the same syringe. Where fresh semen is used, this must be allowed to liquefy before inserting it into the syringe, or alternatively, the syringe may be back-loaded.

A conception cap, which is a form of conception device, may be inserted into the vagina following insemination and may be left in place for several hours. Using this method, a woman may go about her usual activities while the cervical cap holds the semen in the vagina close to the entrance to the cervix. Advocates of this method claim that it increases the chances of conception. One advantage with the conception device is that fresh, non-liquefied semen may be used. The man may ejaculate straight into the cap so that his fresh semen can be inserted immediately into the vagina without waiting for it to liquefy, although a collection cup may also be used. Other methods may be used to insert semen into the vagina notably involving different uses of a conception cap. These include a specially designed conception cap with a tube attached which may be inserted empty into the vagina after which liquefied semen is poured into the tube. These methods are designed to ensure that semen is inseminated as close as possible to the cervix and that it is kept in place there to increase the chances of conception.

Intrauterine

Intrauterine insemination (IUI) involves injection of washed sperm directly into the uterus with a catheter. Insemination in this way means that the sperm do not have to swim through the cervix which is coated with a mucus layer. This layer of mucus can slow down the passage of sperm and can result in many sperm perishing before they can enter the uterus. Donor sperm is sometimes tested for mucus penetration if it is to be used for ICI inseminations but partner sperm may or may not be able to pass through the cervix. In these cases, the use of IUI can provide a more efficient delivery of the sperm. In general terms, IUI is usually regarded as more efficient than ICI or IVI. It is therefore the method of choice for single and lesbian women wishing to conceive using donor sperm since this group of recipients usually require artificial insemination because they do not have a male partner, not because they have medical problems. Owing to the high number of these recipients using donor sperm services, IUI is therefore the most popular method of insemination today at a fertility clinic. The term 'artificial insemination' has, in many cases, come to mean IUI insemination.

It is important that washed sperm is used because unwashed sperm may elicit uterine cramping, expelling the semen and causing pain, due to content of prostaglandins. (Prostaglandins are also the compounds responsible for causing the myometrium to contract and expel the menses from the uterus, during menstruation.) Resting on the table for fifteen minutes after an IUI is optimal for the woman to increase the pregnancy rate.

Using this technique, as with ICI, fertilisation takes place naturally in the external part of the fallopian tubes in the same way that occurs following intercourse.

For heterosexual couples, the indications to perform an intrauterine insemination are usually a moderate male factor, the incapability to ejaculate in vagina and an idiopathic infertility. A short period of ejaculatory abstinence before intrauterine insemination is associated with higher pregnancy rates. For the man, a TMS of more than 5 million per ml is optimal. In practice, donor sperm will satisfy these criteria and since IUI is a more efficient method of artificial insemination than ICI and, because of its generally higher success rate, IUI is usually the insemination procedure of choice for single women and lesbians using donor semen in a fertility centre. Lesbians and single women are less likely to have fertility issues of their own and enabling donor sperm to be inserted directly into the womb will often produce a better chance of conceiving.

Lesbian couples may either select a friend or family member as their sperm donor or choose an anonymous donor. After a donor sperm is selected, a couple can proceed with donor sperm IUI. IUI is the least expensive option for same-sex couples and can be done without the use of medication. According to a study from 2021, lesbian women undergoing IUI had a clinical pregnancy rate of 13.2% per cycle and 42.2% success rate given the average number of cycles at 3.6.

Unlike ICI, intrauterine insemination normally requires a medical practitioner to perform the procedure. One of the requirements is to have at least one permeable tube, proved by hysterosalpingography. The infertility duration is also important. A female under 30 years of age has optimal chances with IUI;  A promising cycle is one that offers two follicles measuring more than 16 mm, and estrogen of more than 500 pg/mL on the day of hCG administration. However, GnRH agonist administration at the time of implantation does not improve pregnancy outcome in intrauterine insemination cycles according to a randomized controlled trial. One of the prominent private clinic in Europe has published a data A multiple logistic regression model showed that sperm origin, maternal age, follicle count at hCG administration day, follicle rupture, and the number of uterine contractions observed after the second insemination procedure were associated with the live-birth rate
The steps to follow in order to perform an intrauterine insemination are:
 Mild Controlled Ovarian Stimulation (COS): there is no control of how many oocytes are at the same time when stimulating ovulation. For that reason, it is necessary to check the amount being ovulated via ultrasound (checking the amount of follicles developing at the same time) and administering the desired amount of hormones.
 Ovulation Induction: using substances known as ovulation inductors.
 Semen capacitation: wash and centrifugation, swim-up, or gradient. The insemination shouldn't be performed later than an hour after capacitation. 'Washed sperm' may be purchased directly from a sperm bank if donor semen is used, or 'unwashed semen' may be thawed and capacitated before performing IUI insemination, provided that the capacitation leaves a minimum of, usually, five million motile sperm.
 Luteal Phase support: a lack of progesterone in the endometrium could end a pregnancy. To avoid that 200 mg/day of micronized progesterone are administered via vagina. If there is pregnancy, this hormone is kept administering until the tenth week of pregnancy.

IUI can be used in conjunction with controlled ovarian hyperstimulation (COH). Clomiphene Citrate is the first line, Letrozole is second line, in order to stimulate ovaries before moving on to IVF. Still, advanced maternal age causes decreased success rates; women aged 38–39 years appear to have reasonable success during the first two cycles of ovarian hyperstimulation and IUI. However, for women aged over 40 years, there appears to be no benefit after a single cycle of COH/IUI. Medical experts therefore recommend considering in vitro fertilization after one failed COH/IUI cycle for women aged over 40 years.

A double intrauterine insemination theoretically increases pregnancy rates by decreasing the risk of missing the fertile window during ovulation. However, a randomized trial of insemination after ovarian hyperstimulation found no difference in live birth rate between single and double intrauterine insemination. A Cochrane found uncertain evidence about the effect of IUI compared with timed intercourse or expectant management on live birth rates but IUI with controlled ovarian hyperstimulation is probably better than expectant management.

Due to the lack of reliable evidence from controlled clinical trials, it is not certain which semen preparation techniques are more effective (wash and centrifugation; swim-up; or gradient) in terms of pregnancy and live birth rates.

Intrauterine tuboperitoneal
Intrauterine tuboperitoneal insemination (IUTPI) involves injection of washed sperm into both the uterus and fallopian tubes. The cervix is then clamped to prevent leakage to the vagina, best achieved with a specially designed double nut bivalve (DNB) speculum. The sperm is mixed to create a volume of 10 ml, sufficient to fill the uterine cavity, pass through the interstitial part of the tubes and the ampulla, finally reaching the peritoneal cavity and the Pouch of Douglas where it would be mixed with the peritoneal and follicular fluid. IUTPI can be useful in unexplained infertility, mild or moderate male infertility, and mild or moderate endometriosis. In non-tubal sub fertility, fallopian tube sperm perfusion may be the preferred technique over intrauterine insemination.

Intratubal
Intratubal insemination (ITI) involves injection of washed sperm into the fallopian tube, although this procedure is no longer generally regarded as having any beneficial effect compared with IUI. ITI however, should not be confused with gamete intrafallopian transfer, where both eggs and sperm are mixed outside the woman's body and then immediately inserted into the fallopian tube where fertilization takes place.

Pregnancy rate

The rates of successful pregnancy for artificial insemination are 10-15% per menstrual cycle using ICI, and 15–20% per cycle for IUI. In IUI, about 60 to 70% have achieved pregnancy after 6 cycles.

However, these pregnancy rates may be very misleading, since many factors have to be included to give a meaningful answer, e.g. definition of success and calculation of the total population. These rates can be influenced by age, overall reproductive health, and if the patient had an orgasm during the insemination. The literature is conflicting on immobilization after insemination has increasing the chances of pregnancy  Previous data suggests that it is statistically significant for the patient to remain immobile for 15 minutes after insemination, while another review article claims that it is not. A point of consideration, is that it does cost the patient or healthcare system to remain immobile for 15 minutes if it does increase the chances. For couples with unexplained infertility, unstimulated IUI is no more effective than natural means of conception.

The pregnancy rate also depends on the total sperm count, or, more specifically, the total motile sperm count (TMSC), used in a cycle. The success rate increases with increasing TMSC, but only up to a certain count, when other factors become limiting to success. The summed pregnancy rate of two cycles using a TMSC of 5 million (may be a TSC of ~10 million on graph) in each cycle is substantially higher than one single cycle using a TMSC of 10 million. However, although more cost-efficient, using a lower TMSC also increases the average time taken to achieve pregnancy. Women whose age is becoming a major factor in fertility may not want to spend that extra time.

Samples per child
The number of samples (ejaculates) required to give rise to a child varies substantially from person to person, as well as from clinic to clinic. However, the following equations generalize the main factors involved:

For intracervical insemination:

 N is how many children a single sample can give rise to.
 Vs is the volume of a sample (ejaculate), usually between 1.0 mL and 6.5 mL
 c is the concentration of motile sperm in a sample after freezing and thawing, approximately 5–20 million per ml but varies substantially
 rs is the pregnancy rate per cycle, between 10% to 35% 
 nr is the total motile sperm count recommended for vaginal insemination (VI) or intra-cervical insemination (ICI), approximately 20 million pr. ml.
The pregnancy rate increases with increasing number of motile sperm used, but only up to a certain degree, when other factors become limiting instead.

With these numbers, one sample would on average help giving rise to 0.1–0.6 children, that is, it actually takes on average 2–5 samples to make a child.

For intrauterine insemination, a centrifugation fraction (fc) may be added to the equation:
fc is the fraction of the volume that remains after centrifugation of the sample, which may be about half (0.5) to a third (0.33).

On the other hand, only 5 million motile sperm may be needed per cycle with IUI (nr=5 million)

Thus, only 1–3 samples may be needed for a child if used for IUI.

Social implications
One of the key issues arising from the rise of  dependency on assisted reproductive technology (ARTs) is the pressure placed on couples to conceive, "where children are highly desired, parenthood is culturally mandatory, and childlessness socially unacceptable".

The medicalization of infertility creates a framework in which individuals are encouraged to think of infertility quite negatively. In many cultures donor insemination is religiously and culturally prohibited, often meaning that less accessible "high tech" and expensive ARTs, like IVF, are the only solution.

An over-reliance on reproductive technologies in dealing with infertility prevents many – especially, for example, in the "infertility belt" of central and southern Africa – from dealing with many of the key causes of infertility treatable by artificial insemination techniques; namely preventable infections, dietary and lifestyle influences.

If good records are not kept, the offspring when grown up risk accidental incest.

Legal restrictions 
Some countries restrict artificial insemination in a variety of ways. For example, some countries do not permit AI for single women, and other countries do not permit the use of donor sperm.

As of May 2013, the following European countries permit medically assisted AI for single women:

  Belarus
  Belgium
  Britain
  Bulgaria
  Denmark
  Estonia
  Finland
  Germany
  Greece
  Hungary
  Iceland
  Ireland
  Latvia
  Moldova
  Montenegro
  Netherlands
  North Macedonia
  Romania
  Russia
  Spain
  Ukraine
  Armenia
  Cyprus

Opposition and criticism

Some theologically-buttressed arguments reject the moral validity of this practice, such as Pope John XXIII. However, according to a document of the USCCB, the intrauterine insemination (IUI) of “licitly obtained” (normal intercourse with a silastic sheath i.e. a perforated condom) but technologically prepared semen sample (washed, etc.) has been neither approved nor disapproved by Church authority and its moral validity remains under discussion.

Other animals

Artificial insemination is used for pets, livestock, endangered species, and animals in zoos or marine parks difficult to transport.

Reasons and techniques

It may be used for many reasons, including to allow a male to inseminate a much larger number of females, to allow the use of genetic material from males separated by distance or time, to overcome physical breeding difficulties, to control the paternity of offspring, to synchronize births, to avoid injury incurred during natural mating, and to avoid the need to keep a male at all (such as for small numbers of females or in species whose fertile males may be difficult to manage).

Artificial insemination is much more common than natural mating, as it allows several female animals to be impregnated from a single male. For instance, up to 30-40 female pigs can be impregnated from a single boar. Workers collect the semen by masturbating the boars, then insert it into the sows via a raised catheter known as a pork stork. Boars are still physically used to excite the females prior to insemination, but are prevented from actually mating.

Semen is collected, extended, then cooled or frozen. It can be used on-site or shipped to the female's location. If frozen, the small plastic tube holding the semen is referred to as a straw. To allow the sperm to remain viable during the time before and after it is frozen, the semen is mixed with a solution containing glycerol or other cryoprotectants. An extender is a solution that allows the semen from a donor to impregnate more females by making insemination possible with fewer sperm. Antibiotics, such as streptomycin, are sometimes added to the sperm to control some bacterial venereal diseases. Before the actual insemination, estrus may be induced through the use of progestogen and another hormone (usually PMSG or Prostaglandin F2α).

History

The first viviparous animal to be artificially fertilized was a dog. The experiment was conducted with success by the Italian Lazzaro Spallanzani in 1780. Another pioneer was the Russian Ilya Ivanov in 1899. In 1935, diluted semen from Suffolk sheep was flown from Cambridge in Britain to Kraków, Poland, as part of an international research project. The participants included Prawochenki (Poland), Milovanoff (USSR), Hammond and Walton (UK), and Thomasset (Uruguay).

Modern artificial insemination was pioneered by John O. Almquist of Pennsylvania State University.  He improved breeding efficiency by the use of antibiotics (first proven with penicillin in 1946) to control bacterial growth, decreasing embryonic mortality, and increase fertility. This, and various new techniques for processing, freezing, and thawing of frozen semen significantly enhanced the practical utilization of artificial insemination in the livestock industry and earned him the 1981 Wolf Foundation Prize in Agriculture.  Many techniques developed by him have since been applied to other species, including humans.

Species
Artificial insemination is used in many non-human animals, including sheep, horses, cattle, pigs, dogs,  pedigree animals generally, zoo animals, turkeys and creatures as tiny as honeybees and as massive as orcas (killer whales).

Artificial insemination of farm animals is common in the developed world, especially for breeding dairy cattle (75% of all inseminations). Swine are also bred using this method (up to 85% of all inseminations). It is an economical means for a livestock breeder to improve their herds utilizing males having desirable traits.

Although common with cattle and swine, artificial insemination is not as widely practiced in the breeding of horses. A small number of equine associations in North America accept only horses that have been conceived by "natural cover"  or "natural service" – the actual physical mating of a mare to a stallion – the Jockey Club being the most notable of these, as no artificial insemination is allowed in Thoroughbred breeding. Other registries such as the AQHA and warmblood registries allow registration of foals created through artificial insemination, and the process is widely used allowing the breeding of mares to stallions not resident at the same facility – or even in the same country – through the use of transported frozen or cooled semen.

In modern species conservation, semen collection and artificial insemination are used also in birds. In 2013 scientist of the Justus-Liebig-University of Giessen, Germany, from the working group of Michael Lierz, Clinic for birds, reptiles, amphibians, and fish, developed a novel technique for semen collection and artificial insemination in parrots producing the world's first macaw by assisted reproduction.

Scientists working with captive orcas were able to pioneer the technique in the early 2000s, resulting in "the first successful conceptions, resulting in live offspring, using artificial insemination in any cetacean species". John Hargrove, a SeaWorld trainer, describes Kasatka as being the first orca to receive artificial insemination.

Violation of rights

Artificial insemination on animals has been criticised as a violation of animal rights, with animal rights advocates equating it with rape and arguing it constitutes institutionalized bestiality. Artificial insemination of farm animals is condemned by animal rights campaigners such as People for the Ethical Treatment of Animals (PETA) and Joey Carbstrong, who identify the practice as a form of rape due to its sexual, involuntary and perceived painful nature. Animal rights organizations such as PETA and Mercy for Animals frequently write against the practice in their articles. Much of the meat production in the United States depends on artificial insemination, resulting in an explosive growth of the procedure over the past three decades. The state of Kansas makes no exceptions for artificial insemination under its bestiality law, thus making the procedure illegal.

See also

 Accidental incest
 Conception device
 Donor conceived people
 Ejaculation
 Embryo transfer
 Ex-situ conservation
 Frozen bovine semen
 Frozen zoo
 Intracytoplasmic sperm injection
 Semen extender
 Sperm bank
 Sperm donation
 Sperm sorting
 Surrogacy
 Wildlife

References

Further reading
 Hammond, John, et al., The Artificial Insemination of Cattle (Cambridge, Heffer, 1947, 61pp)

External links

 Detailed description of the different fertility treatment options available
 A history of artificial insemination
 What are the Ethical Considerations for Sperm Donation?
 United States state court rules sperm donor is not liable for children
 UK Sperm Donors Lose Anonymity
 AI technique in the equine
 IntraUterine TuboPeritoneal Insemination (IUTPI)
 The Hastings Center's Bioethics Briefing Book entry on assisted reproduction 
 Annales de Gembloux L´Organisation Scientifique de l Índustrie Animale en URSS, Artificial Insemination in the URSS, by Luis Thomasset, 1936

 
Fertility medicine
Reproduction in mammals
Livestock
Pets
Cryobiology
Semen
Assisted reproductive technology
Theriogenology
Ethically disputed business practices towards animals